Dichrorampha flavidorsana is a moth belonging to the family Tortricidae subfamily Olethreutinae 
Tribe Grapholitini first described by Henry Guard Knaggs in 1867.

It is native to Europe.

References

Grapholitini